Ballinger is an interdisciplinary design firm, one of the first in the United States to merge the disciplines of architecture and engineering into a professional practice. The firm's single office in Philadelphia, Pennsylvania houses a staff of over 250 people. Ballinger is one of the largest architectural firms in the Philadelphia region and known for its work in academic, healthcare, corporate, and research planning and design.

History

Ballinger traces its history to 1878 when Walter Harvey Geissinger established a practice in Philadelphia. In 1885, Geissinger entered into a partnership with Edward M. Hales. Four years later, Walter Francis Ballinger entered the firm of Geissinger and Hales. In 1895, Ballinger replaced Geissinger as a principal in the firm, and it became known as Hales and Ballinger. In 1901, Edward M. Hales retired, and in 1902, the firm was renamed Ballinger & Perrot. Emile G. Perrot was a young architect at the time who gained national recognition for his innovative design work with reinforced concrete. After Ballinger bought out Perrot in 1920, the firm became known as Ballinger Company.

In the 1950s, Robert Ballinger succeeded his father, Walter Ballinger, and along with brothers John D. de Moll and Louis de Moll, introduced the “power pole” to deliver power, chilled water and laboratory gases in research and health care environments.

In 1983, the deMoll brothers sold the firm to ten Ballinger employees. The transfer of ownership included promising young architects William R. Gustafson  and Edward Jakmauh  who would continue to lead the firm into the new millennium.

Today, the firm is owned by leaders who actively guide projects from concept through to completion.

Ballinger's early accomplishments and designs

1900s 
In the early 1900s, Ballinger was one of the largest commercial and industrial design firms in the United States, designing a number of landmark projects for the Victor Talking Machine Company (e.g. The Nipper Building), and subsequently RCA, as well as the first facility for the Joseph M. Campbell Company, now known as the Campbell Soup Company. Additionally, Walter Ballinger and Emile Perrot published Inspector's Handbook of Reinforced Concrete in 1909.

1920s
In 1928, Ballinger built the Commodore Theatre, a grand cinema in West Philadelphia that held 1,105 seats.  This building is now home of the Masjid Al-Jamia of Philadelphia.

In 1923, Ballinger began design on its first hospital, the Philadelphia Home for Incurables/Inglis House. Also in 1923, Ballinger built Benevolent and Protective Order of Elks, Lodge Number 878 in New York City.

Walter F. Ballinger and Clifford H. Shivers file a patent in 1921 for the Super Span saw-tooth roof truss which reduced the need for columns and opened up manufacturing plant floor space.

1930s 
By the mid 1930s, Ballinger had completed 16 new hospitals.

1940s
In the 1940s, Ballinger was at the epicenter of the information age with the design of one of the first "computer rooms." Utilizing over 17,000 vacuum tubes, the ENIAC was developed by the University of Pennsylvania's Moore School of Electrical Engineering during World War II.

The ENIAC initiated the modern computing industry and the firm went on to design technology-related facilities for IBM and the Rand Corporation (later to become the Sperry Rand Corporation, and now known as Unisys).

1950s
Ballinger designs the TWA Maintenance Hangar at Philadelphia International Airport — "an early and unusual example of the use of a cable supported roof structure to provide the clear floor space needed for an airplane hangar." (Constructed 1955–1956)

1970s
Architects William Gustafson and Ed Jakmauh join Ballinger and bring in a major commission for Wills Eye Hospital in Center City Philadelphia. This 230,000 SF new hospital building laid the foundation for what would become a thriving healthcare design practice at Ballinger.

1980s
Under new leadership, Ballinger wins a national competition to design a new 200-acre world headquarters for Hershey Foods and teams with Pei Cobb Freed on the design of high rise complex Commerce Square. The Wills Eye building is completed in 1981 and becomes the first Ballinger project to be published in Architectural Record.

Notable recent projects

Notable recent awards
AIA Pennsylvania, COTE Award of Excellence, 2022 – University of Michigan – Kinesiology Building
AIA Pennsylvania, Firm of the Year Award, 2020
Healthcare Design Magazine, Award of Merit, 2019 – NewYork-Presbyterian Hospital – David H. Koch Center for Ambulatory Care
AIA Pennsylvania, Honor Award, 2018 – University of Maryland, College Park –  A. James Clark Hall
ENR MidAtlantic, Award of Merit, Higher Education/Research, 2017 – Children's Hospital of Philadelphia – Roberts Center for Pediatric Research
 SCUP/AIA/CAE Honor Award for Excellence in Architecture for a New Building – George Washington University – Science and Engineering Hall
 ASHRAE Technology Award, 1st Place, New Educational Facility, 2017 – Johns Hopkins University – Undergraduate Teaching Laboratories
 AIA Award of Honor, Built, New Jersey Chapter, 2016 – Rutgers University – New Jersey Institute for Food Nutrition & Health
 SCUP/AIA/CAE Honor Award for Excellence in Architecture-Building Additions, Renovation, or Adaptive Reuse, 2016 – Johns Hopkins University – Undergraduate Teaching Laboratories
 AIA Award of Honor, Orlando Chapter, 2016 – University of Florida – Harrell Medical Education Building
 IIDA "Best of Year" Award for Interior Design, 2015 – George Washington University – Science & Engineering Hall
 AIA Silver Award, Unbuilt, Philadelphia Chapter, 2014 – Adelphi University – Nexus Academic Building/Welcome Center
 AIA/AAH Healthcare Design Award, 2014 – Penn Medicine – Lancaster General Health, Ann B. Barshinger Cancer Institute
 Lab of the Year, R&D Magazine, 2012 – University of Wisconsin-Madison – Wisconsin Institutes for Discovery
 Excellence in Craftsmanship Award, General Building Contractors Association, 2011 – The Boeing Company – Integrated Defense Building 3-61
 Merit Award, American Institutes of Architects, 2008 – Brown University – Life Sciences Building
 Modern Healthcare Award of Excellence, 2008 – Weill Cornell Medical College – Weill Greenberg Center

References

External links 

 

Architecture firms based in Pennsylvania
Engineering companies of the United States